The UConn Huskies baseball team represents the University of Connecticut, in Storrs, Connecticut, in college baseball. The program is classified as NCAA Division I, and the team competes in the Big East Conference. The team is coached by Jim Penders.

UConn has appeared in five College World Series and 23 NCAA Tournaments.

History
The Huskies were a regional power under coaches J. Orlean Christian and Larry Panciera, making 12 appearances in the NCAA tournament and five appearances in the College World Series from 1957 to 1979.  The Huskies made their first Super Regional appearance in 2011, defeating traditional power Clemson before falling to eventual national champion South Carolina.  Connecticut has claimed four Big East Conference baseball tournament Championships in 1990, 1994, 2013, and 2021, three Big East Regular season championships in 2011, 2021, and 2022 and one divisional championship in the first year of Big East competition in 1985.  During their seven year tenure in the American, they appeared in three NCAA Tournaments and won the 2016 American Athletic Conference baseball tournament.

Facilities
The Huskies play at the new 1,500-seat Elliot Ballpark, located at the southwest edge of the campus athletic complex, which opened for the 2021 season. It replaced J. O. Christian Field, a 2,000-seat stadium located across the street from the new ballpark.  Some games are also played at minor league venues in Connecticut, most frequently Dunkin' Donuts Park in Hartford, Connecticut, Senator Thomas J. Dodd Memorial Stadium in Norwich, Connecticut, and New Britain Stadium in New Britain, Connecticut, all of which seat over 6,000 spectators.

In 2017, UConn released plans for new athletic and recreation facilities, including a new baseball stadium whose name would later be revealed as Elliot Ballpark. It is being named after the primary donors to the ballpark project, the Elliot family, headed by Doug Elliot, a former UConn baseball player who became an executive with The Hartford. The stadium is being built across the street from J. O. Christian Field, on the site of Morrone Stadium, and will seat 1,500.  Construction on the athletic complex began in mid-2018.

Year by year results

Head coaches

The following is a list of all UConn coaches and their known records, through the 2017 season.

Huskies in the pros
Connecticut has produced dozens of professional players, coaches, and umpires, most notably Jeff Fulchino (Florida Marlins, Kansas City Royals, Houston Astros, San Diego Padres), Jesse Carlson (Detroit Tigers, Houston Astros, Texas Rangers, Toronto Blue Jays, Boston Red Sox), Bob Schaefer (numerous coaching positions with 11 teams, currently Washington Nationals), Charles Nagy (Cleveland Indians, San Diego Padres; coach Arizona Diamondbacks), Walt Dropo (1950 AL Rookie of the Year), Jim Reynolds (umpire), and Dan Iassogna (umpire).  Ten players were selected in the 2011 MLB Draft, including first round picks Matt Barnes (Boston Red Sox) and George Springer (Houston Astros). Anthony Kay was also drafted in the first round by the NY Mets.  As of 2017, Nick Ahmed, Matt Barnes, Scott Oberg, George Springer and Anthony Kay are on active Major League rosters.

Player awards

Retired numbers
The Huskies have retired three numbers in their more than 100-year history.

All-Americans
The following All-Americans are recognized by the University of Connecticut.  First team selections are noted with a check.

References

External links
 Official website